Jumu may refer to:

 Luritja, another name of this indigenous Australian Western Desert language
 Arabic for Friday
 Jumu'ah, Muslim prayer done on Fridays
 Eric B. Jumu, Sierra Leone politician
 Beech wood, in Chinese antique furniture

See also
 Juma people, indigenous people of Brazil
 Jump (disambiguation)